Mysteries of Egypt is an IMAX film about Howard Carter's discovery of King Tutankhamen's tomb in 1922. Directed by Bruce Neibaur, the film was released June 2, 1998.

Cast
 Omar Sharif - Grandfather
 Kate Maberly - Granddaughter
 Timothy Davies - Howard Carter
 Julian Curry - Carnarvon

Release
The film was released June 2, 1998 and grossed $40,593,486 from 27 theatres in the United States and Canada. It was the highest-grossing limited release of 1999 with $25 million earned in the year.

References

External links

1998 films
1998 documentary films
Documentary films about Egypt
IMAX short films
IMAX documentary films
Cultural depictions of Tutankhamun
Films about archaeology
1990s English-language films
1990s short documentary films